The 2018 Atlanta United 2 season is the club's first year of existence, their first season in the United Soccer League, the second tier of the American soccer pyramid.

Players

As of October 14, 2018.
The squad of Atlanta United 2 will be composed of an unrestricted number of first-team players on loan to the reserve team, players signed to ATLUTD2, and Atlanta United Academy players. Academy players who appear in matches with ATLUTD2 will retain their college eligibility.

Player movement

In

Out

Academy Leaves for College

Competitions

USL regular season

Standings

Results summary

Results by matchday

Matches

Statistics

Top scorers

Appearances and goals

Numbers after plus-sign(+) denote appearances as a substitute.

References

2018 USL season
American soccer clubs 2018 season
Atlanta United 2
Atlanta United 2 seasons